Sagarmoy Sensharma (born 8 May 1966) is an Indian former cricketer. He played 47 first-class matches for Bengal between 1987 and 1997.

References

External links
 

1966 births
Living people
Indian cricketers
Bengal cricketers
Cricketers from Kolkata